Eriq Ebouaney (born 3 October 1967) is a French actor. He is best known for his portrayal as the Congolese Prime Minister Patrice Lumumba in the 2000 film Lumumba, as "Blacktie" in Brian De Palma's Femme Fatale and as "Ice" in the 2008 action film Transporter 3 in which he starred opposite Jason Statham.

Early life
Ebouaney was born in Angers, France, the son of Cameroonian immigrants. As a child he didn't show an interest in acting and was set on becoming a businessman. However, at the age of 30, he joined a theatre company and left his job as a sales manager to become a professional actor.

Career

He made his film debut in 1996 in the Cédric Klapisch directed film Chacun cherche son chat. He landed a leading role in the 2000 film Lumumba in which he portrayed Prime Minister Patrice Lumumba. The film was shot in Beira, Mozambique.

In 2002, he starred in Brian De Palma's Femme Fatale alongside Antonio Banderas. In 2004, he played the character of Jean Claude in Mark Bamford's debut feature Cape of Good Hope. In 2005 he starred in the award-winning Ridley Scott film, Kingdom of Heaven, in which he starred alongside Michael Sheen, Liam Neeson, Orlando Bloom, David Thewlis, Martin Hancock and Nathalie Cox.

In 2006, he starred in The Front Line and La piste.

In 2008, he played a supporting role in the critically acclaimed Australian film Disgrace featuring American actor John Malkovich, a small role in the Italian film Bianco e nero and later was cast as "Ice" in Transporter 3, featuring British actor Jason Statham.

Filmography

References

External links

Official website
 

1967 births
Living people
French male film actors
French people of Cameroonian descent
Male actors from Paris
Cameroonian male actors
20th-century French male actors
21st-century French male actors
People from Angers